Nepeta racemosa, the dwarf catnip or raceme catnip, syn. N. mussiniii, is a species of flowering plant in the mint family Lamiaceae, native to the Caucasus, Turkey and northern Iran.

This plant is one of several Nepeta species to be cultivated as an ornamental. It is particularly suitable for the front of a flower border or as groundcover. It has gained the Royal Horticultural Society's Award of Garden Merit, as has the cultivar ‘Walker’s Low’

Nepetas are notable for their euphoric effect on some domestic cats. It is thought to be caused by the chemical nepetalactone which also has effects on some insects, repelling cockroaches and mosquitoes.

The Latin specific epithet racemosa means “having racemes of flowers”.

References

Cat attractants
Flora of Iran
Flora of Turkey
racemosa